Robert Allnutt Haywood (16 September 1887 – 1 June 1942) was an English cricketer who played for Northamptonshire County Cricket Club between 1908 and 1924.

He was born in Eltham in Kent, the son of Robert and Elizabeth Haywood. His father had played one first-class match for Kent County Cricket Club in 1878 and his younger brother Archie played Second XI cricket for Kent either side of World War I and later coached at Taunton School. Haywood was for a time engaged with the Kent Nursery, but considering that he would do better with Northamptonshire, he took the necessary steps to qualify for the county. Haywood appeared in 172 first-class cricket matches, primarily as a batsman. He scored 8,373 runs with a highest score of 198, one of 20 centuries, and took 34 wickets with a best performance of 3/73. In 1921, he carried his bat against Sussex, making 131 out of his side’s total of 251. In his final season he made 1,887 runs and was considered "by far the most valuable batsman for the county", scoring eight of the 11 centuries made by the side that season.

Haywood retired from professional cricket to become coach at Fettes College in Scotland. His son, also Robert, played one first-class match for Scotland in 1949. Haywood died in Edinburgh in June 1942 aged 54.

References

External links

1887 births
1942 deaths
English cricketers
Northamptonshire cricketers
Northampton Town F.C. players